Joshua Hall (1768–1862) was an American politician and the eighth governor of Maine.

Joshua Hall may also refer to:

Joshua G. Hall (1828–1898), American politician and U.S. Representative from New Hampshire
Joshua M. Hall, American politician and member of Connecticut House of Representatives

See also
Josh Hall (disambiguation)